Cornelius "Neil" McCallum (3 July 1868 – 5 November 1920) was a Scottish footballer who played as an outside right for Renton, Celtic, Blackburn Rovers, Nottingham Forest, Notts County, Heanor Town and Scotland.

McCallum had the distinction of being part of the Renton team that defeated West Bromwich Albion in a challenge match in May 1888, billed as the "World Championship". By now also an international but still a teenager, later in the same month he joined the newly formed Celtic and scored the club's first ever goal in their inaugural match, a 5–2 win over Rangers. When he won the Scottish Cup during his second spell at Celtic in 1892 alongside former Renton teammate James Kelly, they became the first players to win the competition with two different clubs, having also been victorious with their old club in 1888.

His nephew Charles and great-nephew Denis McCallum were also footballers, the latter playing for Celtic in the 1920s.

Notes

References

Sources

External links

London Hearts profile (Scotland)
London Hearts profile (Scottish League)

1868 births
1920 deaths
Scottish footballers
Footballers from West Dunbartonshire
Scotland international footballers
Renton F.C. players
Celtic F.C. players
Blackburn Rovers F.C. players
Nottingham Forest F.C. players
Notts County F.C. players
Association football outside forwards
Scottish Football League players
English Football League players
Scottish Football League representative players
Newark Town F.C. players
Loughborough F.C. players
Heanor Town F.C. players
Football Alliance players
People from Bonhill